Pyhäjärvi is a large lake in Pyhäjärvi, Finland. It belongs to the Pyhäjoki main catchment area. Pyhäjärvi (meaning: Holy lake) is very common name in Finland. There are 39 lakes with the same name.

See also
List of lakes in Finland

References

Landforms of North Ostrobothnia
Lakes of Pyhäjärvi